Pikes Peak is an unincorporated community in Van Buren Township, Brown County, in the U.S. state of Indiana.

History
According to legend, James Ward was intent on moving to Colorado. He wrote on the side of his conestoga wagon "Pikes Peak or Bust". Miller made it out of Columbus to the area now known as Pikes Peak. To save face he called his store Pikes Peak and the name stuck.

A post office was established at Pikes Peak in 1868, and remained in operation until it was discontinued in 1907.

Geography

References

External links

Unincorporated communities in Brown County, Indiana
Unincorporated communities in Indiana
1868 establishments in Indiana
Populated places established in 1868